William Neihsial Lengen (born 26 September 1998) is an Indian professional footballer who plays as an attacking midfielder for I-League club Rajasthan United.

Club career

Rajasthan United

In August 2022, Rajasthan United secured the signature of Neihsial ahead of the Durand Cup campaign.

Career statistics

Club

References

Living people
1998 births
Indian footballers
Association football midfielders
Footballers from Manipur
Indian Super League players
ATK (football club) players
Sudeva Delhi FC players
I-League players
Rajasthan United FC players